Morrisville is an unincorporated community located in Clinton County, Ohio, United States.

History
Morrisville was laid out in 1840, and named for Isaac Morris, the original owner of the town site. A post office called Morrisville was established in 1860, and remained in operation until 1907.

Gallery

References

Unincorporated communities in Clinton County, Ohio
Unincorporated communities in Ohio